Founded in 1993, Automation Centre LLC is a privately held independent software vendor located in Tucson, Arizona, in the United States of America.

Their first product, Tracker Suite, was released in 1994.  Tracker Suite is a groupware solution for the Lotus Notes/Domino messaging platform. The first release of Tracker Suite provided functions for time reporting.

As development continued, new components were incorporated into Tracker Suite, including modules for project management, HR, help desk services and others.  In 2001, Automation Centre released a similar groupware product for the Microsoft Outlook / Exchange messaging platform, called TrackerOffice. In 2006, Automation Centre released TrackerSuite.Net, a purely Web based suite of integrated business applications similar to Tracker Suite, but with cloud computing capabilities.

Automation Centre collectively brands these solution sets as Tracker.
The company was notified in the 2014 Gartner Magic Quadrant for Cloud-Based IT Project and Portfolio Management Services.

References

 Penington, A. (2002, August). Building Character: Art Imitates Business Life for this Entrepreneur. Entrepreneur. Retrieved March 16, 2011 from Findarticles.com
 Sodoma, B. (1998). Automation Centre: Founder Trades Tennis Nets for Internet. Inside Tucson Business. p. 6.

External links 
 

Software companies based in Arizona
Companies established in 1993
Companies based in Tucson, Arizona
Software companies of the United States